Charles Woodward may refer to:

Charles Edgar Woodward (1876–1942), United States federal judge and Attorney General of Illinois
Charles A. Woodward (1842–1937), Canadian merchant, founder of the Woodward's Department Stores Limited and Member of the Legislative Assembly of British Columbia
Chunky Woodward (Charles N. Woodward, 1924–1990), Canadian merchant and rancher, grandson of Charles A. Woodward
Charles William Woodward (1895–1969), judge in Maryland

See also
Charles F. Woodard (1848–1907), Justice of the Maine Supreme Judicial Court
Woodward (disambiguation)